Glover H. Cary (May 1, 1885 – December 5, 1936) was a member of the United States House of Representatives from Kentucky.

He was born in Calhoun, McLean County, Kentucky in 1885. He attended public and private schools and Centre College in Danville, Kentucky. He was employed as deputy clerk, bank cashier, and newspaper editor. Cary studied law, was admitted to the bar in June 1909 and commenced practice in Calhoun, Kentucky. He was a member of the Kentucky General Assembly from 1914 to 1917 and prosecuting attorney for McLean County from 1918 to 1922. He served as the Commonwealth's Attorney for the sixth judicial district from 1922 until his resignation on February 28, 1931, having been elected to Congress. Cary moved to Owensboro, Kentucky in 1926. He was elected as a Democrat to the Seventy-second, Seventy-third and Seventy-fourth Congresses and served from March 4, 1931, until his death. He had been reelected to the Seventy-fifth Congress and was a delegate to the Democratic National Convention in 1932.

Cary married Bess W. Miller on April 4, 1906.  They had five children: William, Sara, Helen, Elizabeth, and Glover.  He died in Cincinnati, Ohio, on December 5, 1936, and was interred in Calhoun Cemetery, in Calhoun, Kentucky.

In 1940, the new Owensboro Bridge in Owensboro, Kentucky was dedicated to his memory.

See also

 List of United States Congress members who died in office (1900–49)

External links

 

1885 births
1936 deaths
People from McLean County, Kentucky
Centre College alumni
Kentucky Commonwealth's Attorneys
Kentucky lawyers
Democratic Party members of the Kentucky House of Representatives
American prosecutors
Burials in Kentucky
Democratic Party members of the United States House of Representatives from Kentucky
20th-century American politicians
20th-century American lawyers